Nawahi may refer to:

Joseph Nāwahī
Emma ʻAima Nāwahī
"King" Bennie Nawahi
Nawahi (crater)